Some Girls Do is the sixth studio album by singer Lee Aaron, released on September 23, 1991 through Attic Records. It reached No. 38 on the RPM Canadian Albums Chart on November 30, 1991 and held that position for a week. The only single, "Sex with Love", reached No. 55 on the RPM Canadian Singles Chart on October 26, 1991 and held that position for three weeks. The album would go on to receive a Juno Award nomination for Rock Album of the Year in 1992.

Track listing

Personnel
Lee Aaron – vocals, background vocals
John Albani – guitar, keyboard, background vocals, production
Randy Cooke – drums
Rob Laidlaw – bass, background vocals
Lou Pomanti – organ
Phil Naro – background vocals
Andy Curran – background vocals
Brian Allen – background vocals, production
Harry Hess – background vocals
John Derringer – spoken vocals
Lenny DeRose – engineering, mixing
Paula Anderson – engineering, mixing

Charts

References

Lee Aaron albums
1991 albums
Attic Records albums